Black Horse Memories, is a 2015 Iranian-Turkish drama film directed by Shahram Alidi. It is the second film by Alidi.

Plot
A black horse plunges to her memories with Aaseke. They have been close friends since their childhood. Now, Aaseke is martyred during her mission with her friends. These young boy-and-girl fighters endeavor to teach Kurdish language in Kurdistan villages in confrontation with central government. Teaching and even talking Kurdish have been banned in Turkey for many years. Her comrades are trying to reveal the place of her corpse was hidden, and then they are carrying out her will before burial ceremony. She has some points in her will list. The important one is meeting again her black horse. They start seeking to find the black horse.

Cast 
 Berrak Tüzünataç as Zaria
 Diman Zandi as Aseke
 Şenay Aydın as Anahita
 Vildan Atasever as Vian
 Aziz Çapkurt as Elias
 Bilal Bulut as Khezr
 Maryam Bobani as Aseke's Mother
 Tara Jaff as Shahmaran
 Şevval Sam as Nurse

Accolades 
 20th Busan International Film Festival/ South Korea. October 1–10, 2015
 2nd Brisbane Asia Pacific Film Festival/ Australia. November 19–29, 2015 
 9th Asia Pacific Screen Awards, Brisbane/ Australia. November 26, 2015
 15th !f Istanbul International Independent Film Festival, Turkey, February 18–28, 2016. "!f Inspired Competition" section
 4th Duhok International Film Festival, Kurdistan Region, Iraq. September 9–16, 2016
Slemani International Film Festival, Kurdistan Region, Iraq. October 1–4, 2016 "Competition"
Winner of Special Jury Prize, 9th Kurdish Filmdays "Sercavan" Vienna, Austria. November 24–27, 2016

References

External links 
 
 Black Horse Memories in the 20th Busan International Film Festival
 Black Horse Memories: Busan Review
 Black Horse Memories Iranian films win awards at Slemani festival
 Black Horse Memories Istanbul International Independent Film Festival
 Black Horse Memories
 Horse Memories Islamic Republic News Agency
 Horse Memories

2015 films
Films directed by Shahram Alidi
Films set in Turkey
Films set in Kurdistan
Films about horses